Meet the Brady Bunch is the second studio album by American pop group the Brady Bunch. It was released on April 17, 1972, by Paramount Records. Two songs on the album, "We Can Make the World a Whole Lot Brighter" and "Time to Change", were featured on season 3, episode 16 of The Brady Bunch, "Dough Re Mi".

In 1996, the album was released on CD for the first time with the addition of two bonus tracks from 1973's Chris Knight & Maureen McCormick.

Critical reception

Billboard published a review in the April 29, 1972 issue that said: "Ask any nine-year-old; this LP is going to be a big hit. "I Just Want to Be Your Friend" and "Ain't It Crazy" are probably the key tunes here, but semi-choral versions of "American Pie" and "Me and You and a Dog Named Boo" also stand out. The TV show of the Brady Bunch will be the key sales impetus here".

In the April 22 issue, Cashbox published a review which said: "The title is your invitation to sample the singing wares of this popular congregation. The accent is decidedly on the up-tempo and the cheerful as the group romps through "Me and You and a Dog Named Boo", "We Can Make the World a Whole Lot Brighter", "Baby I'm-a Want You", "Day After Day" and even "American Pie". MOR programmers should have a veritable field day with this disk and fans of the Bunch will undoubtedly rush to the local shop for a copy".

Commercial performance
The album peaked at No. 108 on the US Billboard Top LPs & Tape chart. It was the group's only album to chart.

The album's first single, "Time to Change", was released in January 1972 and did not chart. The second single, "We'll Always Be Friends", was released in May 1972 and also failed to chart.

Track listing

Personnel
Adapted from the album liner notes.
 Al Capps – arrangements
 Jim Jenkins – photography
 Chris Knight – vocals
 Mike Lookinland – vocals
 Maureen McCormick – vocals
 Jackie Mills – producer
 Susan Olsen – vocals
 Eve Plumb – vocals
 Barry Williams – vocals

Charts

References

1972 albums
The Brady Bunch albums
Paramount Records (1969) albums